Gjest Baardsen is a Norwegian film from 1939 directed by Tancred Ibsen. Alfred Maurstad played the title role. The film is based on the life of the outlaw Gjest Baardsen, but it is a blend of fact and fiction. The plot is taken from a chapbook published by Holger Sinding under the pseudonym Halle Sira.

The film was shot at the Fuhr farm in Luster, at Turtagrø in the Sogn Mountains, and at Videseter in the Stryn Mountains.

The film was screened in the United States with English subtitles in the 1940s.

Plot
The film is set in a time of famine. Norway has been at war with England and Sweden, and times are difficult. Gjest Baardsen has gotten into trouble with the law, apparently due to a trifle. But Gjest breaks free, and instead it is the sheriff that is handcuffed while Gjest escapes.

Reviews
Newspapers have written the following about the film: "Meet the master thief and the folk hero Gjest Baardsen, who steals from the rich and gives to the poor. He tricks the constable and bailiff into a fight, and no prisons or chains can hold him." "Maurstad plays the folk hero with an obsessive freshness, with daring moves and a Hardanger fiddle, and escapes over fjords and mountains."

Cast
 Alfred Maurstad as  Gjest Baardsen
 Vibeke Falk as Anna Reinche 
 Joachim Holst-Jensen as Mons Peder Michelsen, the jailer
 Lauritz Falk as an officer
 Jens Holstad as an officer
 Karl Bergmann as Reincke, the customs officer
 Sophus Dahl as a constable
 Lars Tvinde as a constable
 Sigurd Magnussøn as a constable
 Henny Skjønberg as Karen 
 Henrik Børseth as a farmer 
 Edvard Drabløs as a fisherman 
 Martin Linge as a fisherman 
 Einar Tveito as Mathias Strandvik 
 Ole Leikvang as a farmer 
 Johannes Jensen as Johannes, the constable's officer
 Victor Ivarson as the inspector
 Johan Hauge as the judge
 Hans Bille as the chief of police
 Thorleif Mikkelsen as a policeman

Songs
"Fjellsangen" (lyrics by Holger Sinding, melody by Adolf Kristoffer Nielsen), sung by Alfred Maurstad
"Svarterabben" (lyrics and melody by Alfred Maurstad), sung by Alfred Maurstad
Alfred Maustad and an orchestra directed by Adolf Kristoffer Nielsen also recorded these two songs in Oslo on February 20, 1940. They were released on the Telefunken 78 rpm record T-8261, and the first song also on the Sonora 78 rpm record 3748.

References

External links

Gjest Baardsen at the National Library of Norway

1939 drama films
Norwegian black-and-white films
Norwegian romantic drama films
1930s crime comedy films
Films directed by Tancred Ibsen
1930s Norwegian-language films
Films set in Norway
Films set in the 19th century